The Sumathi Best Television Documentary Award is presented annually in Sri Lanka by the Sumathi Group  for the best Sri Lankan television documentary.

The award was first given in 1995. Following is a list of the winners since then.

Awards

References

Sumathi Awards